DYNB-TV, channel 46, is a relay television station owned by Nation Broadcasting Corporation, is the affiliated station of the Philippine television network One Sports; The station its sister company of TV5 Network Inc. Its transmitter is located at Piña-Tamborong-Alaguisoc Road, Jordan, Guimaras Province. While the new DTV Channel 18.

Digital television

Digital channels

UHF Channel 18 (497.143 MHz)

See also
 TV5
 One Sports
 List of television and radio stations owned by TV5 Network

One Sports (TV channel) stations
Television stations in Iloilo City
Television channels and stations established in 1996